Palmyra Township may refer to:

 Palmyra Township, Lee County, Illinois
 Palmyra Township, Knox County, Indiana
 Palmyra Township, Warren County, Iowa, in Warren County, Iowa
 Palmyra Township, Douglas County, Kansas
 Palmyra Township, Michigan
 Palmyra Township, Renville County, Minnesota
 Palmyra Township, Halifax County, North Carolina, in Halifax County, North Carolina
 Palmyra Township, Portage County, Ohio
 Palmyra Township, Pike County, Pennsylvania
 Palmyra Township, Wayne County, Pennsylvania
 Palmyra Township, Brown County, South Dakota, in Brown County, South Dakota

Township name disambiguation pages